Konstantin Vladimirovich Gorovikov (Russian: Константин Владимирович Горовиков; born August 31, 1977) is a Russian professional ice hockey forward, who is currently an unrestricted free agent who most recently played for Dynamo Moscow of the Kontinental Hockey League (KHL). Player of the Russia national team. Became World champion in 2009 at the world championship in Bern, Switzerland. He has won the Gagarin Cup twice with Dynamo in 2012 and 2013.

Career statistics

Regular season and playoffs

International

References

External links

1977 births
Avangard Omsk players
HC Dynamo Moscow players
Grand Rapids Griffins (IHL) players
Living people
Ottawa Senators draft picks
Russian ice hockey centres
Salavat Yulaev Ufa players
Severstal Cherepovets players
SKA Saint Petersburg players
Sportspeople from Novosibirsk